Lake Placid, New York has been the host to two Winter Olympic Games:

 1932 Winter Olympics
 1980 Winter Olympics